James Cowan may refer to:

James Cowan (author) (1942–2018), Australian author 
James Cowan (bishop) (born 1952), Anglican Bishop of Columbia from 2004 to 2013
James Cowan (British Army officer), Major General in the British Army
James Cowan (footballer) (1868–1918), Aston Villa footballer of the 19th century
James Cowan (Manitoba physician) (1831–1910), Manitoba physician and politician from the 19th century
James Cowan (Manitoba politician) (1914–1997), Manitoba politician from the 20th century
James Cowan (New Zealand writer) (1870–1943), New Zealand writer of the  20th century 
James Cowan (Ontario politician) (1803–1900), politician in Canada West
Jimmy Cowan (rugby league) (born 1975), rugby league footballer for Scotland, and Oldham Roughyeds
James Cowan (Scottish politician) (1816–1895), Liberal Member of Parliament for Edinburgh 1874–1882
James Cowan (South Australian politician) (1848–1890), South Australian politician
James Cowan, fl. 1879, Australian public servant, husband of Edith Cowan
Jim Cowan (born 1942), Canadian Senator from Nova Scotia
Jimmy Cowan (born 1982), New Zealand rugby union footballer
Jimmy Cowan (footballer) (1926–1968), Scottish footballer of the 1940s and 1950s
James Cowan (sport shooter) (1856–1943), British Olympic shooter
James Cowan (cricketer) (born 1989), English cricketer
James Alexander Cowan (1901–1978), Canadian writer and public relations consultant

See also
Cowan (surname)